St John's Church, Deritend was a parish church in the Church of England in Birmingham, which stood from 1735 until it was demolished in 1947.

History

A church was established in 1380 when the villagers in Deritend were given the right to build their own chapel rather than travel three miles to Aston Parish Church.

The church was noted as being the place of worship of John Rogers, the first English Protestant martyr under Mary I.

The church was rebuilt in 1735, and the tower added in 1762. In 1939 the church was united with St Basil's Church, Deritend and St Basil's was used as the church of the united benefice. St John's was demolished in 1947. The calvary which had been erected as a memorial for the First World War was moved to St Gabriel's Church, Weoley Castle.

Bells

Eight bells were cast in 1776 by Robert Wells of Aldbourne, Wiltshire. They were removed and recast into a new ring which were installed in Bishop Latimer Memorial Church, Winson Green and then were moved to St John's Church, Perry Barr in 1972.

Organ

In 1906 the church acquired an organ from St Martin in the Bull Ring which dated from 1822. It was installed by Walter James Bird.

References

Church of England church buildings in Birmingham, West Midlands
John